The Igreja de São Francisco is a church in Estremoz Municipality, Évora District, Portugal. It is classified as a national monument.

References

Sao Francisco Estremoz
National monuments in Évora District
Estremoz